The University of Santo Tomas System is a network of private schools that belong to the Philippine Dominican Province of the Order of Preachers. The system is an integration of select schools run by the Dominicans. These select schools are the University of Santo Tomas - Manila, University of Santo Tomas - Legazpi (formerly Aquinas University) of Legazpi City, University of Santo Tomas -Santa Rosa, University of Santo Tomas - General Santos, UST Angelicum College Quezon City and Angelicum School Iloilo.

The UST System is one of the two educational institution systems of the Dominicans of the Philippine Dominican Province. The other is the Letran System, which has four campuses.

Institutions
The University of Santo Tomas System consists of three existing campuses and two upcoming satellite campuses located in Southern Tagalog and Mindanao. The Manila campus is the main educational institution of the system.

The integration of select Dominican schools was a mandate of the 2012 and 2016 Provincial Chapters of the Philippine Dominican Province. In the 2012 Acts, the integration was planned to facilitate the coordination of the apostolic priorities and sharing of resources of several institutions. In December 2014, the Aquinas University of Legazpi in Albay (AUL), Angelicum College in Quezon City, and Angelicum School Iloilo, signed a memorandum of intent to integrate with UST Manila. The future UST campuses in General Santos and Santa Rosa, Laguna, will also be part of the system. The integration plan was reinforced in the 2016 Acts.

The two existing constituent units are independent campuses. Each campus is headed by a rector. The Rector Magnificus of UST Manila is also the rector of UST Angelicum. Its board of trustees is composed of 12 representatives from UST Manila and three from UST Angelicum. Angelicum College's signature non-graded system of education is retained.

UST-Legazpi has fiscal and administrative independence from the main campus. The rector and board of trustees are also different. The integration of AUL also entailed the renaming of its university hospital to UST-Legazpi Hospital.

In December 2020, the construction of the UST-Dr. Tony Tan Caktiong Innovation Center began in UST Santa Rosa. It is the first building in the campus.

References

 
1611 establishments in the Philippines
Pontifical universities
Educational institutions established in the 1610s
Research universities in the Philippines
Dominican educational institutions in the Philippines
ASEAN University Network